Kuansing Sport Centre Stadium is a multi-purpose stadium in Kuantan Singingi Regency, Indonesia.  It is currently used mostly for football matches.

Buildings and structures in Riau
Football venues in Indonesia